Maxwell–Boltzmann may refer to:

Maxwell–Boltzmann statistics, statistical distribution of material particles over various energy states in thermal equilibrium
Maxwell–Boltzmann distribution, particle speeds in gases

See also
Maxwell (disambiguation)
Boltzmann (disambiguation)